Teaching Hospital, Peradeniya, is one of the three hospitals in Peradeniya, Sri Lanka. It is one of the leading community teaching hospitals in Sri Lanka, affiliated with the University of Peradeniya. In addition to delivering medical care to patients, it facilitates undergraduate training programmes for the university students studying in the faculties of Medicine, Dental Sciences and Allied Health Sciences. It was established in 1980.

Location
The hospital is situated aside the A1 highway connecting Kandy and Colombo, near the Royal Botanical Gardens, Peradeniya.

Administration
It is established and administered under the purview of the Ministry of Health Care and Nutrition, Sri Lanka. The hospital has a bed strength of 960, as of 2009. It is the second largest hospital in Central Province, Sri Lanka, second only to the National Hospital, Kandy.

See also
List of university hospitals
Medical education

References

External links
Official website of Ministry of Health, Sri Lanka

Hospitals in Kandy
Teaching hospitals in Sri Lanka
University of Peradeniya